Gábor Bogdán (born 30 August 1980 in Szarvas) is a Hungarian football player who currently plays for Kaposvári Rákóczi FC.

References
Player profile at HLSZ 

1980 births
Living people
People from Szarvas
Hungarian footballers
Association football midfielders
Békéscsaba 1912 Előre footballers
Szolnoki MÁV FC footballers
Kaposvári Rákóczi FC players
Sportspeople from Békés County